The Pennsylvania Department of Education is the executive department of the state charged with publicly funded preschool, K-12 and adult educational budgeting, management and guidelines. As the state education agency, its activities are directed by the governor appointed Pennsylvania's Secretary of Education. The agency is headquartered at 333 Market Street in Harrisburg. The Pennsylvania Department of Education oversees 500 public school districts of Pennsylvania, over 170 public charter schools (2019), Career and Technology Centers/Vocational Technical schools, 29 Intermediate Units, the education of youth in State Juvenile Correctional Institutions, and publicly funded preschools (Head Start and PreK Counts Keystone Stars). In 2019, the Pennsylvania Department of Education employs approximately 500 persons.

The agency maintains a database of all education institutions in the Commonwealth with associated data. EdNA  These entities include school districts and their schools, intermediate units, area vocational technical schools, charter schools, nonpublic and private schools, higher education institutions and more.

History 
Following passage and signing of the Free School Law on April 1, 1834, the Secretary of the Commonwealth acted as head of the Common School System until 1837.  In that year a separate Department of Schools was created with a Superintendent of Common Schools as its chief officer. In 1873, the title was changed to Superintendent of Public Instruction, and greater responsibilities were assigned to that official and to the Department. In 1969, the name of the Department of Public Instruction was changed to the Department of Education, with the title of Superintendent of Public Instruction changed to the Secretary of Education.  It previously ran the Pennsylvania State Board of Censors.

Purpose 
The Department has broad discretionary powers in both the development and administration of educational policies which enhance the educational experience and quality in Pennsylvania.  The Department also works as an ongoing study of the educational process within the state, conducting studies and programs designed to evaluate specific needs or qualities of the system.  In doing so, the Pennsylvania Department of Education will recommend changes and improvements to the Governor, the Board of Education, and the General Assembly.

The Pennsylvania Department of Education also oversees policies of public libraries, academic libraries, and the State Library of Pennsylvania located in Harrisburg.  It provides policy of equal opportunity in the educational system, with special regard to nonpublic education and state policy of education.  It is within the Pennsylvania Department of Education's mission to collaborate with other state educational departments in an effort to create a cohesive and dynamic learning environment.

Offices and sub groups
The Pennsylvania Department of Education operates several offices and participates in many state related agencies/Boards.

Office of Elementary and Secondary Education
Office of Postsecondary and Higher Education
Office of Child Development and Early Learning (OCDEL) in association with the Pennsylvania Department of Human Services
Office of Commonwealth Libraries
State Board of Education 
Professional Standards and Practices Commission
Office of Food and Nutrition Programs 
Special Education Advisory Panel 
State Boards of Private Schools

Power Library
Power Library is the online portal to Pennsylvania libraries, a service of the Office of Commonwealth Libraries, Pennsylvania Department of Education.

Secretaries of Education
Source:
 Khalid Mumin (Nominated January 2023)
 Noe Ortega (2020–present)
 Pedro Rivera (2015-2020)
 Carolyn C. Dumaresq (Confirmed August 2013)
 Ronald Tomalis (Confirmed April 2011)
 Joe Torsella (Confirmed August 2008)
 Gerald L. Zahorchak (Confirmed February 2006)
 Francis V. Barnes (Confirmed November 2004/Resigned June 2005)
 Vicki L. Phillips (Confirmed March 2003/Resigned April 2004)
 Charles B. Zogby (Confirmed June 2001/Resigned January 2003)
 Eugene W. Hickok (Confirmed May 1995/Resigned March 2001)
 Jane Carroll (acting) 1995
 Donald M. Carroll Jr. 1989-1995
 Carl S. (Terry) Dellmuth 1989
 Thomas K. Gilhool 1987-1989
 William Logan 1987
 D. Kay Wright 1986-1987
 Margaret A. Smith 1984-1986
 Robert C. Wilburn 1983-1984
 Robert G. Scanlon 1979-1983
 Caryl M. Kline 1977-1979
 Robert N. Hendershot 1977
 John Pittenger 1972-1976
 David Kurtzman 1969-1971

See also 
 List of Pennsylvania state agencies
 State education agency

References

External links 
 Pennsylvania Department of Education
 

Education, Department of
Department
State departments of education of the United States
Educational administration
State agencies of Pennsylvania
Government agencies established in 1837
1837 establishments in Pennsylvania